Mastax subornatella is a species of beetle in the family Carabidae found in Angola, Namibia, South Africa and Zambia.

References

Mastax subornatella
Beetles of Africa
Beetles described in 1958